The Owensboro Oilers were a minor league baseball club, based in Owensboro, Kentucky, from 1936 until 1955. The team was a member of the class-D level Kentucky–Illinois–Tennessee League (or KITTY League). The team was originally formed in 1935 as the Portageville Pirates and represented Portageville, Missouri, in the league. On July 17, 1936 the Portageville Pirates moved to Owensboro after posting a 26-35 record. The team was listed in the record books for 1936 as Portageville-Owensboro Pirates, or as the Owensboro Pirates after the move. The following year, the team was renamed the Owensboro Oilers.

The Oilers and Pirates were preceded in Kentucky–Illinois–Tennessee League play by the Owensboro Distillers. The Distillers played in the 1903, 1913, 1914 and 1916 seasons.

Notable alumni

Baseball Hall of Fame alumni

 Tony Kubek (1954) Inducted, 2008 Ford C. Frick award

 Travis Jackson (1950) Inducted, 1982

Notable alumni

 Sam Dente (1941)

 Don McMahon (1950) MLB All-Star

 Ollie Pickering (1914)

 Chuck Tanner (1946-1947) Manager: 1979 World Series Champion Pittsburgh Pirates

 Lee Thomas (1954) 2 x MLB All-Star

Year-by-year record

References

Owensboro, Kentucky
Baseball teams established in 1935
Defunct baseball teams in Kentucky
Defunct baseball teams in Missouri
Pittsburgh Pirates minor league affiliates
New York Yankees minor league affiliates
Boston Bees minor league affiliates
Boston Braves minor league affiliates
Boston Red Sox minor league affiliates
Cleveland Guardians minor league affiliates
1935 establishments in Kentucky
Baseball teams disestablished in 1955
1955 disestablishments in Kentucky
Kentucky-Illinois-Tennessee League teams